San Colombano Certenoli is a comune (municipality) in the Metropolitan City of Genoa in the Italian region Liguria, located about  east of Genoa. It is the largest municipality in the Val Fontanabuona.

San Colombano Certenoli borders the following municipalities: Borzonasca, Carasco, Coreglia Ligure, Leivi, Mezzanego, Orero, Rapallo, Rezzoaglio, Zoagli.

References

External links
 Official website

Cities and towns in Liguria